George Brudenell may refer to:

George Brudenell, 3rd Earl of Cardigan (1685–1732), Earl of Cardigan
George Brudenell, 4th Earl of Cardigan (1712–1790)
George Bridges Brudenell (1726–1801), British politician

See also
George Brudenell-Bruce (disambiguation)
Brudenell (disambiguation)